David Joseph Marcinyshyn (born February 4, 1967) is a Canadian retired professional ice hockey defenceman.

Marcinyshyn was born in Edmonton, Alberta. Undrafted in the NHL Entry Draft, Marcinyshyn signed with the New Jersey Devils in 1987 and made his NHL debut for the Devils during the 1990–91 NHL season playing nine games in total and spent four seasons with the American Hockey League's Utica Devils.  In 1991, he was traded to the Quebec Nordiques for Brent Severyn and played five games for the team.  He moved to the New York Rangers in 1992 and managed just two games for them.  In total, Marcinyshyn played 16 regular season games, scoring one assist and collected 49 penalty minutes.  He then spent four seasons in the International Hockey League before moving to the Deutsche Eishockey Liga in Germany in two seasons before retiring in 1999.

Career statistics

Regular season and playoffs

External links

1967 births
Binghamton Rangers players
Canadian ice hockey defencemen
Cincinnati Cyclones (IHL) players
Düsseldorfer EG players
Flint Spirits players
Halifax Citadels players
Ice hockey people from Edmonton
Kalamazoo Wings (1974–2000) players
Kamloops Blazers players
Living people
Milwaukee Admirals (IHL) players
New Jersey Devils players
New York Rangers players
Quebec Nordiques players
Schwenninger Wild Wings players
Undrafted National Hockey League players
Utica Devils players
Canadian expatriate ice hockey players in Germany